The following article is a summary of the 2017–18 football season in France, which was the 84th season of competitive football in the country and ran from July 2017 to June 2018.

League tables

Ligue 1

Ligue 2

Championnat National

Championnat National 2

Cup competitions

2017–18 Coupe de France

Final

2017–18 Coupe de la Ligue

Final

The final was held on 31 March 2018 at the Nouveau Stade de Bordeaux.

2017 Trophée des Champions

References

 
Seasons in French football